The 1896 Spanish general election was held on Sunday, 12 April (for the Congress of Deputies) and on Sunday, 26 April 1896 (for the Senate), to elect the 7th Cortes of the Kingdom of Spain in the Restoration period. All 445 seats in the Congress of Deputies (plus two special districts) were up for election, as well as 180 of 360 seats in the Senate.

The previous Liberal government of Práxedes Mateo Sagasta had resigned in March 1895, following the outbreak of revolution in Cuba and a period dominated by social conflict and war in Morocco. Antonio Cánovas del Castillo of the Conservative Party was tasked to form a new government, but the general election was delayed by over a year until their feasibility in Cuba could be ensured. The election resulted in a large majority for the Conservatives amidst the boycott of most pro-republican parties.

This would be the last election to be contested by Cánovas, as he would be assassinated while in office in August 1897 by an anarchist, Michele Angiolillo.

Overview

Electoral system
The Spanish Cortes were envisaged as "co-legislative bodies", based on a nearly perfect bicameral system. Both the Congress of Deputies and the Senate had legislative, control and budgetary functions, sharing equal powers except for laws on contributions or public credit, where the Congress had preeminence. Voting for the Cortes was on the basis of universal manhood suffrage, which comprised all national males over 25 years of age, having at least a two-year residency in a municipality and in full enjoyment of their civil rights. In Cuba and Puerto Rico voting was on the basis of censitary suffrage, with a minimum taxpayer quota—of $5 in Cuba and $10 in Puerto Rico—per territorial contribution or per industrial or trade subsidy (paid at the time of registering for voting), having a particular position (royal academy numerary members; ecclesiastic individuals; active, unemployed or retired public employees; military personnel; widely recognized painters and sculptors; public teachers; etc.), or having at least a two-year residency in a municipality, provided that an educational or professional capacity could be proven.

For the Congress of Deputies, 116 seats were elected using a partial block voting system in 34 multi-member constituencies, with the remaining 329 being elected under a one-round first-past-the-post system in single-member districts. Candidates winning a plurality in each constituency were elected. In constituencies electing eight seats or more, electors could vote for no more than three candidates less than the number of seats to be allocated; in those with more than four seats and up to eight, for no more than two less; in those with more than one seat and up to four, for no more than one less; and for one candidate in single-member districts. The Congress was entitled to one member per each 50,000 inhabitants, with each multi-member constituency being allocated a fixed number of seats. Additionally, literary universities, economic societies of Friends of the Country and officially organized chambers of commerce, industry and agriculture were entitled to one seat per each 5,000 registered voters that they comprised, which resulted in two additional special districts for the 1896 election. The law also provided for by-elections to fill seats vacated throughout the legislature.

As a result of the aforementioned allocation, each Congress multi-member constituency was entitled the following seats:

For the Senate, 180 seats were indirectly elected by the local councils and major taxpayers, with electors voting for delegates instead of senators. Elected delegates—equivalent in number to one-sixth of the councillors in each local council—would then vote for senators using a write-in, two-round majority voting system. The provinces of Álava, Albacete, Ávila, Biscay, Cuenca, Guadalajara, Guipúzcoa, Huelva, Logroño, Matanzas, Palencia, Pinar del Río, Puerto Príncipe, Santa Clara, Santander, Santiago de Cuba, Segovia, Soria, Teruel, Valladolid and Zamora were allocated two seats each, whereas each of the remaining provinces was allocated three seats, for a total of 147. The remaining 33 were allocated to special districts comprising a number of institutions, electing one seat each—the archdioceses of Burgos, Granada, Santiago de Compostela, Santiago de Cuba, Seville, Tarragona, Toledo, Valencia, Valladolid and Zaragoza; the Royal Spanish Academy; the royal academies of History, Fine Arts of San Fernando, Exact and Natural Sciences, Moral and Political Sciences and Medicine; the universities of Madrid, Barcelona, Granada, Havana, Oviedo, Salamanca, Santiago, Seville, Valencia, Valladolid and Zaragoza; and the economic societies of Friends of the Country from Madrid, Barcelona, Havana–Puerto Rico, León, Seville and Valencia. An additional 180 seats comprised senators in their own right—the Monarch's offspring and the heir apparent once coming of age; Grandees of Spain of the first class; Captain Generals of the Army and the Navy Admiral; the Patriarch of the Indies and archbishops; and the presidents of the Council of State, the Supreme Court, the Court of Auditors, the Supreme War Council and the Supreme Council of the Navy, after two years of service—as well as senators for life (who were appointed by the Monarch).

Election date
The term of each chamber of the Cortes—the Congress and one-half of the elective part of the Senate—expired five years from the date of their previous election, unless they were dissolved earlier. The previous Congress and Senate elections were held on 5 and 19 March 1893, which meant that the legislature's terms would have expired on 5 and 19 March 1898, respectively. The monarch had the prerogative to dissolve both chambers at any given time—either jointly or separately—and call a snap election. There was no constitutional requirement for simultaneous elections for the Congress and the Senate, nor for the elective part of the Senate to be renewed in its entirety except in the case that a full dissolution was agreed by the monarch. Still, there was only one case of a separate election (for the Senate in 1877) and no half-Senate elections taking place under the 1876 Constitution.

The Cortes were officially dissolved on 28 February 1896, with the dissolution decree setting the election dates for 12 April (for the Congress) and 26 April 1893 (for the Senate) and scheduling for both chambers to convene on 11 May.

Background

The 1892–1895 Liberal government of Práxedes Mateo Sagasta had been dominated by the situation in Cuba and Puerto Rico—with attempts from Overseas minister Antonio Maura to approve a modest autonomic regime failing to materialize—as well as a war against the Sultanate of Morocco and the persistence of social conflict (which resulted in the approval of a Law of repression of anarchism in 1894). The outbreak of revolution in Cuba in February 1895 and the subsequent assault and looting of two Madrid newspapers—El Resumen and El Globo—by groups of civilians and military personnel, upset about published opinions on an alleged reluctancy to embark with destination to Cuba, caused the downfall of Sagasta's cabinet. In March 1895, Queen Regent Maria Christina tasked Antonio Cánovas del Castillo of the Conservative Party to form a new government, but a new election was delayed until newly-appointed Cuba governor Valeriano Weyler could ensure the feasibility of holding elections in the colony.

Results

Congress of Deputies

Senate

Distribution by group

Notes

References

Bibliography

1896 elections in Spain
1896 in Spain
1896
April 1896 events